Olivier Thomert (born 28 March 1980) is a French former professional footballer who played as a winger who currently plays for French amateur club Claye Souilly Sports.

He made nearly 200 appearances in the top flight of French football.

Career
He started his career at Le Mans, and had spells at Lens, Rennes and Hércules. He rejoined Le Mans on 1 August 2012 for a third spell with the club.

In August 2019, Thomert came out os his retirement, after working as a youth coach for some years. He signed for Regional 2 club Claye Souilly Sports.

Honours
Lens
UEFA Intertoto Cup: 2005

References

External links
Olivier Thomert's profile, stats & pics
Thomert's profile on Sitercl.Com

External links

Living people
1980 births
French people of Martiniquais descent
Association football midfielders
French footballers
French expatriate footballers
Martiniquais footballers
Martinique international footballers
Sportspeople from Versailles, Yvelines
Ligue 1 players
Ligue 2 players
Championnat National 2 players
La Liga players
USL Championship players
Le Mans FC players
RC Lens players
Stade Rennais F.C. players
Hércules CF players
Portland Timbers 2 players
2013 CONCACAF Gold Cup players
French expatriate sportspeople in Spain
French expatriate sportspeople in the United States
Expatriate footballers in Spain
Expatriate soccer players in the United States
Footballers from Yvelines